Sarah Margareta Thomasson (later Voss; 20 July 1925 – 24 March 1996) was a Swedish alpine skier who won a bronze medal in the slalom at the 1954 World Championships. She competed in the slalom, giant slalom and downhill at the 1952 Winter Olympics with the best result of 12th place in the slalom.

References

1925 births
1996 deaths
Swedish female alpine skiers
People from Åre Municipality
Olympic alpine skiers of Sweden
Alpine skiers at the 1952 Winter Olympics
Sportspeople from Jämtland County
20th-century Swedish women